Buffalo Bill State Park is a public recreation area surrounding the reservoir formed by the Buffalo Bill Dam, an impoundment of the Shoshone River, in Park County, Wyoming. The state park, reservoir and dam were named after William "Buffalo Bill" Cody, who founded the nearby town of Cody and who owned much of the land now occupied by the reservoir and park. The park offers camping, hiking, boating, fishing, and picnicking and is managed by Wyoming Division of State Parks and Historic Sites.

History
Buffalo Bill Cody was one of the most colorful figures of the American Old West, mostly known for the shows he organized with cowboy themes. He once owned some of the land that is now part of the state park bearing his name. He sold his property to the United States government prior to the construction of Buffalo Bill Dam. Cody settled in the Shoshone Canyon area in the 1870s. He first came to the region as a guide for a survey expedition. Cody spent parts the next twenty years in the area serving as a hunting guide. Buffalo Bill worked to bring irrigation and agriculture development in Park County. He founded the nearby city of Cody in 1896.

Construction on Buffalo Bill Dam, originally known as Shoshone Dam, began in 1905. The dam is a  concrete arch structure of constant radius. It was part of the Shoshone Project, one of the first projects overseen by the Bureau of Reclamation.

In addition to providing water for irrigation and downstream flood control, Buffalo Bill Dam provides hydropower for a power plant. The first and second units of the power plant were constructed in 1922. A third unit was built in 1931. Units one and two were decommissioned in 1980 and unit three was replaced in 1991.

The original park facilities were flooded when the dam was raised and the reservoir was deepened and widened. The project added  to the area of the lake. A visitors center at the dam was opened upon completion of the heightening of the dam. Further modifications to the dam included an expansion of the underground spillway and addition of gates to the spillway for flow control.

The park's picnicking facilities and fencing were improved in 2007 by the Wyoming Conservation Corps.

Geology
The park occupies the Shoshone Canyon portion of the Shoshone River in the Rocky Mountains of northwestern Wyoming. The area is part of the Absaroka Range, which includes Rattlesnake Mountain, Cedar Mountain (also known as Spirit Mountain), Logan Mountain, Sheep Mountain, and Carter Mountain.

Activities and amenities
Recreational activities at the park include fishing, boating, hiking, camping and picnicking.

References

External links

Buffalo Bill State Park Wyoming State Parks, Historic Sites & Trails
Buffalo Bill State Park Brochure Wyoming State Parks, Historic Sites & Trails

State parks of Wyoming
Protected areas of Park County, Wyoming
Protected areas established in 1957
1957 establishments in Wyoming